UEP may refer to:
Unique-event polymorphism, a class of genetic markers used to define haplogroups
United Egg Producers, an agricultural cooperative in the Midwestern United States which represents the interests of regional egg producers
University of Eastern Philippines, a public university in Northern Samar province
University of Exeter Press, an academic press based in Exeter, United Kingdom
United Effort Plan, a property-holding organization of the FLDS Church
Ashmolean Museum University Engagement Programme, a teaching programme of the Ashmolean Museum of Art and Archaeology in the University of Oxford
US Expatriate Pension, a type of pension/retirement solution for US tax payers who are non US residents 
Unequal error protection, an error correction scheme